Sathanur Dam which forms the Sathanur reservoir, is one of the major dams in Tamil Nadu. It is constructed across the Thenpennai River also called as Pennaiyar River  in Thandarampet taluk among Chennakesava Hills. The dam can be reached by road  from Tiruvannamalai City. It was constructed in 1958. There is also a large crocodile farm and a fish grotto. Parks are maintained inside the dam for tourists to visit and the gardens have been used by the film industry.

History 
The Sathanur Dam Project was proposed in the First Five Year Plans of India and started in the year 1953. The Dam works are completed in the Second Five Year Plans of India and is operational from 1958. The project was inaugurated by the then Chief Minister of Tamil Nadu K. Kamaraj. This is one of the Major irrigation schemes were planned in Kamaraj's period . The other projects are Lower Bhavani, Krishnagiri Dam, Mani Muthuar , Cauvery Delta , Aarani River, Vaigai Dam , Amravathi , Sathanur , Pullambadi, Parambikulam and Neyaru Dams.

The approved cost of the project is ₹2.02 Crores. The project was completed within ₹3.59 Crore (Actual cost). The project is covered under CADA (Command Area Development Authority) Scheme.

Technical details 
The temple is a popular picnic area in the region.

See also

 List of dams and reservoirs in India
sovoor

References

Dams in Tamil Nadu
Reservoirs in Tamil Nadu
Dams completed in 1958
1958 establishments in Madras State
20th-century architecture in India